Wojciech Kubik (13 January 1953 – 16 April 1992) was a Polish luger. He competed in the men's doubles event at the 1972 Winter Olympics.

References

1953 births
1992 deaths
Polish male lugers
Olympic lugers of Poland
Lugers at the 1972 Winter Olympics
People from Bielsko County